Beastmark the Spy is a 1941 spy thriller novel by the British writer J. Storer Clouston. His final published novel, it was one of several notable thrillers he wrote along with The Spy in Black and The Man from the Clouds. It originally appeared as a serial in Blackwood's Magazine.

References

Bibliography
 Burton, Alan. Historical Dictionary of British Spy Fiction. Rowman & Littlefield, 2016.
 Royle, Trevor. Macmillan Companion to Scottish Literature. Macmillan, 1984.

1941 British novels
British war novels
British spy novels
Novels set during World War II
British thriller novels
Novels by J. Storer Clouston
William Blackwood books